M Obaidullah (known by his pen-name Askar Ibne Shaikh; March 30, 1925 – May 18, 2009) was a Bangladeshi writer and theater activist.

Career
Shaikh served as a faculty member of the University of Dhaka at the Department of Statistics.

Works
 Bidrohi Padma

War Crime
Dr. Obaidullah alias Askar collaborated with Pakistan Army in during the Operation Searchlight to assassinate his colleague and once his teacher Abu Naser M. Moniruzzaman, Jyotirmoy Guhathakurta and Govinda Chandra Dev.

Awards
 Bangladesh Shilpakala Academy Award (2006)
 Nazrul Padak (2008)
 Ekushey Padak (1986)
 Bangla Academy Literary Award (1960)

References

1925 births
2009 deaths
People from Mymensingh District
Bangladeshi male writers
Recipients of the Ekushey Padak
Recipients of Bangla Academy Award
Academic staff of the University of Dhaka